Eggstone is a Swedish indie pop band, formed in 1986. They have been called the "godfathers of Swedish pop."

History
The three members of Eggstone -- Per Sunding (vocals, bass), Patrik Bartosch (guitar) and Maurits Carlsson (drums) -- were raised in the small coastal town of Lomma, outside Malmö. They founded the band in 1986. In 1991 they formed Tambourine Studios in Malmö with friends Anders Nordgren and producer Tore Johansson. Their debut single, "Bubblebed," was released that year, followed by an EP Shooting Time. Eggstone signed to Snap, and their debut album Eggstone In San Diego was released in 1992. Its single, "Can't Come Close Enough," became a Swedish radio hit.

Two years later, Eggstone released Somersault, produced by Michael Blair. Its single "Water" became a Japanese hit. The band toured Japan twice, and supported The Cardigans for four dates in London. Eggstone split from MNW's Soap label in 1995 and founded the label Vibrafon. 

In early 1997, Eggstone released Vive La Différence!, their third full-length album, on Vibrafon. Spanish Slalom, a compilation album, was released on Madrid-based Siesta Records in 1998 and a second compilation appeared in 1999 under the Tricatel label, titled Ca Chauffe en Suède!.

In April 2016 the band made a surprise comeback by releasing "Like So," a recording of a 2002 demo. This was the band's first new music in 19 years. They performed live for the first time in almost two decades on March 4, 2017, with the Malmö Symphony Orchestra. Eggstone's first three albums were later re-released by Denmark label Crunchy Frog.

Members
 Patrik Bartosch - guitar
 Maurits Carlsson - drums
 Per Sunding - bass and vocals

Discography

EPs
Bubblebed (1990)
Shooting Time (1991)
At Point Loma (1992)
In Lemon Grove (1992)
April And May (1997)

Albums

Studio albums
Eggstone in San Diego (1992)
Somersault (1994)
Vive La Différence! (1997)

Compilations
Spanish Slalom (1998)
Ça chauffe en Suède! (1999)

Singles
"Water" (1994)
"Summer And Looking For A Job" (1996)
"Never Been A Better Day" (1996)
"Birds In Cages" (1997)
"Like So" (2016)
"The Late" (2019)

References

External links
 Eggstone facebook
 Eggstone website
 Tambourine Studios
 Eggstone on Gracenote

Swedish musical groups